Bryn V. Goldswain (birth unknown) is a Welsh former professional rugby league footballer who played in the 1940s and 1950s.

Goldswain won caps for Wales while at Hull Kingston Rovers, and Oldham 1947–1953 16-caps, and won a cap for Other Nationalities while at Oldham in 1955.

About Goldswain's time, there was Oldham's 2-12 defeat by Barrow in the 1954–55 Lancashire County Cup Final during the 1954–55 season at Station Road, Swinton on Saturday 23 October 1954, and the 10-3 victory over St. Helens in the 1956–57 Lancashire County Cup Final during the 1956–57 season at Station Road, Swinton on Saturday 20 October 1956.

Goldswain's taught boys' Physical education at Hollins Secondary Modern School, Lyndhurst Road, Oldham circa 1952-3.

References

External links
Statistics at orl-heritagetrust.org.uk
Representative Honours

Doncaster R.L.F.C. players
Hull Kingston Rovers players
Oldham R.L.F.C. players
Other Nationalities rugby league team players
Place of birth missing
Possibly living people
Rugby league second-rows
Wales national rugby league team captains
Wales national rugby league team players
Welsh rugby league players
Welsh schoolteachers
Year of birth missing